Amphisbaena nana is a worm lizard species in the family Amphisbaenidae. It is endemic to Brazil.

References

nana
Reptiles described in 2019
Endemic fauna of Brazil
Reptiles of Brazil